Chengguan could refer to nearly 200 towns of the People's Republic of China, many of which are the seats of their counties:

Note: Due to the large number of such locations, some of the provincial sections will be further divided alphabetically by prefecture.

Anhui

Bengbu
Chengguan, Guzhen County, in Guzhen County
Chengguan, Huaiyuan County, in Huaiyuan County
Chengguan, Wuhe County, in Wuhe County

Bozhou
Chengguan, Lixin County
Chengguan, Mengcheng County
Chengguan, Guoyang County, in Guoyang County

Fuyang
Chengguan, Linquan County, in Linquan County
Chengguan, Taihe County, Anhui, in Taihe County

Huainan
Chengguan, Fengtai County, in Fengtai County

Lu'an
Chengguan, Huoqiu County, in Huoqiu County
Chengguan, Shucheng County, in Shucheng County

Fujian
Chengguan, Youxi County, in Youxi County, Sanming

Gansu

Gannan Tibetan Autonomous Prefecture
Chengguan, Lintan County, in Lintan County
Chengguan, Zhugqu County, in Zhugqu County

Jinchang
Chengguan, Yongchang County, in Yongchang County

Lanzhou
Chengguan, Yongdeng County, in Yongdeng County
Chengguan, Yuzhong County, in Yuzhong County

Linxia Hui Autonomous Prefecture
Chengguan, Guanghe County, in Guanghe County
Chengguan, Hezheng County, in Hezheng County

Longnan
Chengguan, Longnan, in Wudu District
Chengguan, Cheng County, in Cheng County
Chengguan, Tanchang County, in Tanchang County
Chengguan, Hui County, in Hui County
Chengguan, Kang County, in Kang County
Chengguan, Li County, Gansu, in Li County
Chengguan, Liangdang County, in Liangdang County
Chengguan, Wen County, Gansu, in Wen County

Pingliang
Chengguan, Jingchuan County, in Jingchuan County
Chengguan, Jingning County, Gansu, in Jingning County

Qingyang
Chengguan, Zhenyuan County, Gansu, in Zhenyuan County

Tianshui
Chengguan, Wushan County, Gansu, in Wushan County

Zhangye
Chengguan, Gaotai County, in Gaotai County

Guangxi
Chengguan, Debao County, in Debao County, Baise
Chengguan, Nandan County, in Nandan County, Hechi
Chengguan, Xincheng County, in Xincheng County, Laibin

Guizhou

Anshun
Chengguan, Pingba County, in Pingba County
Chengguan, Puding County, in Puding County
Chengguan, Zhenning County, in Zhenning Buyei and Miao Autonomous County

Bijie Prefecture
Chengguan, Hezhang County, in Hezhang County
Chengguan, Jinsha County, in Jinsha County
Chengguan, Qianxi County, Guizhou, in Qianxi County
Chengguan, Zhijin County, in Zhijin County

Guiyang
Chengguan, Kaiyang County, in Kaiyang County

Liupanshui
Chengguan, Pan County, in Pan County

Qiandongnan Miao and Dong Autonomous Prefecture
Chengguan, Shibing County, in Shibing County

Qiannan Buyei and Miao Autonomous Prefecture
Chengguan, Dushan County, in Dushan County
Chengguan, Guiding County, in Guiding County

Henan

Anyang
Chengguan, Hua County, Henan, in Hua County
Chengguan, Neihuang County, in Neihuang County
Chengguan, Tangyin County, in Tangyin County

Hebi
Chengguan, Xun County, in Xun County

Jiaozuo
Chengguan, Xiuwu County, in Xiuwu County

Kaifeng
Chengguan, Kaifeng County, in Xiangfu District
Chengguan Town, Lankao County, in Lankao County
Chengguan, Qi County, Kaifeng, in Qi County
Chengguan, Tongxu County, in Tongxu County
Chengguan, Weishi County, in Weishi County

Luoyang
Chengguan, Yanshi, in Yanshi City
Chengguan, Luanchuan County, in Luanchuan County
Chengguan, Luoning County, in Luoning County
Chengguan, Mengjin County, in Mengjin County
Chengguan, Ruyang County, in Ruyang County
Chengguan, Song County, in Song County
Chengguan, Xin'an County, in Xin'an County
Chengguan, Yichuan County, Henan, in Yichuan County
Chengguan, Yiyang County, Henan, in Yiyang County

Luohe
Chengguan, Luohe, in Yancheng District
Chengguan, Linying County, in Linying County

Nanyang
Chengguan, Fangcheng County, in Fangcheng County
Chengguan, Neixiang County, in Neixiang County
Chengguan, Nanzhao County, in Nanzhao County
Chengguan, Tanghe County, in Tanghe County
Chengguan, Tongbai County, in Tongbai County
Chengguan, Xinye County, in Xinye County

Pingdingshan
Chengguan, Baofeng County, in Baofeng County
Chengguan, Jia County, Henan, in Jia County

Puyang
Chengguan, Fan County, in Fan County
Chengguan, Nanle County, in Nanle County
Chengguan, Puyang County, in Puyang County
Chengguan, Qingfeng County, in Qingfeng County
Chengguan, Taiqian County, in Taiqian County

Sanmenxia
Chengguan, Lingbao, in Lingbao City City
Chengguan, Lushi County, in Lushi County
Chengguan, Mianchi County, in Mianchi County

Shangqiu
Chengguan, Yongcheng, in Yongcheng City
Chengguan, Minquan County, in Minquan County
Chengguan, Xiayi County, in Xiayi County
Chengguan, Yucheng County, in Yucheng County
Chengguan, Zhecheng County, in Zhecheng County
Chengguan Hui Town, Ningling County, in Ningling County
Chengguan Hui Town, Sui County, Henan, in Sui County

Xinxiang
Chengguan, Fengqiu County, in Fengqiu County
Chengguan, Huojia County, in Huojia County
Chengguan, Yanjin County, Henan, in Yanjin County
Chengguan, Yuanyang County, Henan, in Yuanyang County

Xinyang
Chengguan, Gushi County, in Gushi County
Chengguan, Huaibin County, in Huaibin County
Chengguan, Luoshan County, in Luoshan County
Chengguan, Shangcheng County, in Shangcheng County
Chengguan, Xi County, Henan, in Xi County

Xuchang
Chengguan, Xiangcheng County, Henan, in Xiangcheng County

Zhengzhou
Chengguan, Xinmi, in Xinmi City
Chengguan, Zhongmu County, in Zhongmu County

Zhoukou
Chengguan, Dancheng County, in Dancheng County
Chengguan, Fugou County, in Fugou County
Chengguan, Luyi County, in Luyi County
Chengguan, Xihua County, in Xihua County

Hubei

Huanggang
Chengguan, Hong'an County, in Hong'an County

Shiyan
Chengguan, Fang County, in Fang County
Chengguan, Yunyang District, in Yunyang District
Chengguan, Yunxi County, in Yunxi County
Chengguan, Zhushan County, in Zhushan County
Chengguan, Zhuxi County, in Zhuxi County

Xiangyang
Chengguan, Baokang County, in Baokang County
Chengguan, Gucheng County, Hubei, in Gucheng County
Chengguan, Nanzhang County, in Nanzhang County

Xiaogan
Chengguan, Dawu County, Hubei, in Dawu County
Chengguan, Yunmeng County, in Yunmeng County

Hunan

Changde
Chengguan, Anxiang County, in Anxiang County
Chengguan, Linli County, in Linli County

Chenzhou
Chengguan, Anren County, in Anren County
Chengguan, Guidong County, in Guidong County
Chengguan, Guiyang County, in Guiyang County
Chengguan, Jiahe County, in Jiahe County
Chengguan, Linwu County, in Linwu County
Chengguan, Rucheng County, in Rucheng County
Chengguan, Yizhang County, in Yizhang County
Chengguan, Yongxing County, in Yongxing County

Hengyang
Chengguan, Hengdong County, in Hengdong County

Yueyang
Chengguan, Miluo City, in Miluo City
Chengguan, Huarong County, in Huarong County
Chengguan, Yueyang County, in Yueyang County

Zhuzhou
Chengguan, Chaling County, in Chaling County
Chengguan, You County, in You County

Inner Mongolia
Chengguan, Bayan Nur, in Linhe District, Bayan Nur City
Chengguan, Horinger County, in Horinger County, Hohhot Prefecture
Chengguan, Qingshuihe County, in Qingshuihe County, Hohhot Prefecture
Chengguan, Xinghe County, in Xinghe County, Ulanqab Prefecture

Liaoning
Chengguanzhen Subdistrict (城关镇街道), in Lingyuan City

Ningxia
Chengguan, Longde County, in Longde County, Guyuan Prefecture
Chengguan, Pingluo County, in Pingluo County, Shizuishan Prefecture

Qinghai
Chengguan, Datong Hui and Tu Autonomous County, in Datong Hui and Tu Autonomous County, Xining Prefecture
Chengguan, Huangyuan County, in Huangyuan County, Xining Prefecture

Shandong
Chengguan, Dongming County, in Dongming County, Heze Prefecture

Shaanxi

Ankang
Chengguan, Baihe County, in Baihe County
Chengguan, Hanyin County, in Hanyin County
Chengguan, Langao County, in Langao County
Chengguan, Ningshan County, in Ningshan County
Chengguan, Pingli County, in Pingli County
Chengguan, Shiquan County, in Shiquan County
Chengguan, Xunyang County, in Xunyang County
Chengguan, Zhenping County, Shaanxi, in Zhenping County
Chengguan, Ziyang County, in Ziyang County

Baoji
Chengguan, Fengxiang County, in Fengxiang County
Chengguan, Fufeng County, in Fufeng County
Chengguan, Long County, Shaanxi, in Long County
Chengguan, Qianyang County, in Qianyang County

Hanzhong
Chengguan, Liuba County, in Liuba County
Chengguan, Lueyang County, in Lueyang County
Chengguan, Nanzheng County, in Nanzheng County
Chengguan, Xixiang County, in Xixiang County

Shangluo
Chengguan, Luonan County, in Luonan County
Chengguan, Shanyang County, in Shanyang County
Chengguan, Shangnan County, in Shangnan County

Tongchuan
Chengguan, Yijun County, in Yijun County

Weinan
Chengguan, Baishui County, in Baishui County
Chengguan, Chengcheng County, in Chengcheng County
Chengguan, Dali County, in Dali County
Chengguan, Heyang County, in Heyang County
Chengguan, Pucheng County, Shaanxi, in Pucheng County
Chengguan, Tongguan County, in Tongguan County

Xianyang
Chengguan, Bin County, Shaanxi, in Bin County
Chengguan, Chunhua County, in Chunhua County
Chengguan, Liquan County, in Liquan County
Chengguan, Qian County, in Qian County
Chengguan, Sanyuan County, in Sanyuan County
Chengguan, Xunyi County, in Xunyi County

Yan'an
Chengguan, Ganquan County, in Ganquan County

Sichuan
Chengguan, Huili County, in Huili County, Liangshan Yi Autonomous Prefecture

Tianjin
Chengguan, Tianjin, in Wuqing District, Tianjin

Tibet
Chengguan, Chamdo, in Karub District, Chamdo

Xinjiang
Chengguan, Fukang, in Fukang City, Changji Hui Autonomous Prefecture

Zhejiang
Chengguan, Kaihua County, in Kaihua County, Quzhou Prefecture

Formerly existed or named as "Chengguan"
Chengguan, Funan County, former seat of Funan County, Anhui; in 2006 it was merged, along with Chengjiao Township to form the town of Lucheng (鹿城镇)
Chengguan, Shangshui County, former seat of Shangshui County, Henan; merged sometime between 2006 and 2009
Shuitou, Jiaokou County, Shanxi, named Chengguan until 2001